The Otter Creek Bridge, a -long -wide bridge in Cedar Vale, Kansas,  was built in 1936.  It replaced a previous bridge that was destroyed by flood in June 1935.  It is a camelback through truss bridge made primarily of riveted steel and wood.

It was listed on the National Register of Historic Places in 1990.

It was deemed significant for its engineering.

The bridge would have been built more promptly but the Kansas Emergency Relief Committee, which developed plans for the bridge, was disbanded in 1935 and the plans were lost.  The Works Project Administration, which took over responsibility for the project, had to develop new plans.

References

Road bridges on the National Register of Historic Places in Kansas
Bridges completed in 1936
Buildings and structures in Chautauqua County, Kansas
Truss bridges in the United States
National Register of Historic Places in Chautauqua County, Kansas
Steel bridges in the United States